Ainsley Waugh (born 17 September 1981) is a Jamaican track and field sprinter who specialises in the 100 and 200 metres.

He made his major tournament debut at the 2005 World Championships in Athletics, reaching the quarter-finals in the 100 metres event. He competed at the 2006 Commonwealth Games in both the 100 and 200 metres but failed to progress beyond the semi-finals, registering below-par performances of 10.35 and 21.15.

He finished third in the 200 metres at the Grande Prêmio Brasil Caixa meeting in 2009, setting a new personal best of 20.22 seconds. Waugh also won the 100 metres race with a season's best of 10.16 seconds.

Personal bests

All information taken from IAAF profile.

Achievements

References

External links 
 
 

1981 births
Living people
Jamaican male sprinters
Commonwealth Games gold medallists for Jamaica
Athletes (track and field) at the 2006 Commonwealth Games
Commonwealth Games medallists in athletics
Medallists at the 2006 Commonwealth Games